Lesbian, gay, bisexual, and transgender (LGBT) people in Rondônia, Brazil enjoy many of the same legal protections available to non-LGBT people. Homosexuality is legal in the state.

Recognition of same-sex unions

On 26 April 2013, the Corregedoria Geral de Justiça of the state of Rondônia published in the Diário da Justiça Eletrônico this Friday, April 26, 2013, the Provision 008/2013-CG which provides for the direct qualification for marriage between same-sex and conversion of stable in marriage in the civil registration records of the State of Rondônia.

LGBT adoption

Laws against discrimination

Gender reassignment

References

Rondonia
Rondônia